John Gwynne (fl. 1563) was an English politician.

He was a Member (MP) of the Parliament of England for Bath in 1563.

References

Year of birth missing
Year of death missing
English MPs 1563–1567